The Pugh House is a historic house on US Route 65 in Portland, Arkansas.  The house was built c. 1905 to a design by architect Charles L. Thompson.  It is a basic Foursquare house that has been elaborated by a hip roof with flared eaves, and a wraparound porch supported by Ionic columns and decorated with a neo-classical balustrade.

The house was listed on the National Register of Historic Places in 1982.

See also
Dean House (Portland, Arkansas), next door
National Register of Historic Places listings in Ashley County, Arkansas

References

Houses on the National Register of Historic Places in Arkansas
Neoclassical architecture in Arkansas
Houses completed in 1907
Houses in Ashley County, Arkansas
National Register of Historic Places in Ashley County, Arkansas
1907 establishments in Arkansas